Mahajani is a Unicode block containing characters historically used for writing Punjabi and Marwari.

History
The following Unicode-related documents record the purpose and process of defining specific characters in the Mahajani block:

References 

Unicode blocks
Punjabi language